Kamil Kościelny (born 4 August 1991) is a Polish professional footballer who plays as a defender for Warta Poznań.

Club career
On 4 August 2020, he returned to his first club Stal Mielec that was just promoted to the top-tier Ekstraklasa.

References

1991 births
People from Mielec
Sportspeople from Podkarpackie Voivodeship
Living people
Polish footballers
Association football defenders
Stal Mielec players
Resovia (football) players
Siarka Tarnobrzeg players
Radomiak Radom players
Wigry Suwałki players
Raków Częstochowa players
Puszcza Niepołomice players
Warta Poznań players
Ekstraklasa players
I liga players
II liga players
III liga players